The Justice and Home Affairs Council (JHA) is one of the configurations of the Council of the European Union and is composed of the justice and home affairs ministers of the 27 European Union member states.

Composition
JHA is composed of the justice and home affairs ministers of the 27 European Union member states. While most member states send one minister for both sectors, others send one minister for justice and another for home affairs.

The European Commissioner for Home Affairs, the European Commissioner for Justice and the European Commissioner for Equality also participate in the meetings.

Tasks
The Justice and Home Affairs Council develops cooperation and common policies on various cross-border issues, with the aim of building an EU-wide area of justice.

Cross-border issues include guaranteeing fundamental rights, free movement of citizens, civil protection, asylum and immigration matters, common investigations into cross-border organised crime, the EU's security strategy, including the fight against terrorism and organised crime, cybercrime and violent radicalisation.

The council covers legislation relating to:
 Free movement of persons, asylum and immigration 
 Judicial cooperation in civil matters 
 Judicial cooperation in criminal matters 
 Police and customs cooperation 
 Citizenship of the Union 
 Combating discrimination 
 Fight against terrorism 
 Fight against organised crime 
 Fight against trafficking in human beings 
 Combating drugs 
 Justice, freedom and security: enlargement

Legislative procedure
Since the entry into force of the Lisbon Treaty, the Council takes its decisions on most justice and home affairs legislation in co-decision with the European Parliament according to the ordinary legislative procedure.

See also
 Area of freedom, security and justice
 European Parliament Committee on Civil Liberties, Justice and Home Affairs
 European Commission
 European Commissioner for Justice
 European Commissioner for Equality
 European Commissioner for Home Affairs

References

External links
 About the Justice and Home Affairs Council
 Press releases of the Justice and Home Affairs Council

Council of the European Union